Overgrow may mean:

to grow over with foliage, or to grow beyond normal size; grown over with unwanted vegetation; To cover or own with moss.
a Pokémon ability.

See also
Overgrow (website), a defunct online magazine.
Overgrown by James Blake